

King Yantin-Ammu 
Yantin-'Ammu was a local ruler of the Levantine town Byblos in the Middle Bronze Age, circa 18th-century BCE. He is known from a cuneiform text found in the Syrian city of Mari. The cuneiform texts from Mari are mostly datable to the reign of king Zimri-Lim, who was a contemporary of the Babylonian king Hammurabi. 

The ruler known from this text is speculated to by identical with a governor from Byblos who appears in several texts found at Byblos, written in Egyptian hieroglyphs and mentioning the governor of Byblos, Intin (also found written Yantin or Yantinu in literature, likely all hypocorisms of "Yantin-'Ammu", as once suggested by William F. Albright).

Egyptian governor Intin/Yantin/Yantinu 
Intin is depicted on a relief – now exhibited at the Beirut National Museum – while sitting in front of the cartouche of pharaoh Neferhotep I (13th Dynasty of Egypt); this situation suggests that both rulers were contemporary, with Intin being at least formally a vassal of Neferhotep. On the monument it is said that Intin "was begotten by governor Yakin", meaning that he was the son of this earlier governor. Intin is furthermore known from several scarab seals in fully Egyptian style. It is speculated that the latter was the same person mentioned as Yakin-Ilu on a lapis lazuli cylinder seal belonged to one of Neferhotep's predecessors, pharaoh Sehetepibre Sewesekhtawy.

References 

18th-century BC rulers
Byblos
Rulers of Syria